High School Lover is a 2017 American romantic thriller directed by Jerell Rosales in his theatrical directorial debut. The film stars Paulina Singer, François Arnaud, Lana Condor, Tyler Alvarez, Julia Jones, and James Franco. It premiered in Los Angeles on January of 20, 2017 and then went on to have a television premiere on Lifetime.

Plot
After Kelly Winters, a 17-year-old high school senior, falls in love with Christian Booth, a famous actor who is 9 years older than her, after she snuck into a private Hollywood party at an underground club, her father; Rick (also a cinematographer) tries to intervene before the crush turns into a dangerous obsession.

Cast

 Paulina Singer as Kelley Winters
 François Arnaud as Christian Booth
 Lana Condor as Allison
 Tyler Alvarez as Larry
 Julia Jones as Samantha Winters
 James Franco as Rick Winters
 Ashley Aufderheide as Rachel Winters
 Julian Elijah Martinez as Timothy West
 Julian Cihi as Journey Segal
 Renee Morrison as Jules Kenny
 Prince Rama as themselves
 Vince Jolivette as Film Director Sean
 Fran Kravitz as High School Teacher
 Emmy Elliott as High School Student (uncredited)
 David Alan Madrick as Richard Barley
 Allan Anthony Williams as Dave
 Angelica S Alvarez as Rosie (uncredited)
 Denisa Juhos as Actress
 Jess Domain as Actress
 Michelle Romano as Actress (uncredited)
 Leigh Fitzjames as Clare
 Yevgeniya Kats as Christian's Fan (uncredited)
 Aly Mang as Christian's Fan (uncredited)
 Merritt Chase as Club Patron (uncredited)
 Hansel Pacheco as Club Patron (uncredited)
 Brady Bryson as Boy in Club (uncredited)
 Jacqueline Honulik as Model (uncredited)
 Alexis Martinez as Model (uncredited)

Production
The feature film was shot in August and September 2016 on location in New York City. In January 2017, it was announced that Franco stars in the film and serves as an executive producer. It was also reported that Paulina Singer (ABC/Freeform's Dead of Summer) and François Arnaud (Star of NBC's Midnight Texas) have lead roles in the film.

Release
On January 20, 2017, it made its theatrical world premiere at Laemmle's Royal Theater in Los Angeles, where it played for one week.

In January 2017, it was announced that the film would be a part of Lifetime's slate, and premiered on February 4, 2017.

On November 21, 2017, the film was released on DVD, distributed by Lionsgate under license from A+E Networks.

References

External links
 

2017 films
2017 LGBT-related films
2010s romance films
American romance films
Films about interracial romance
Films about stalking
Home invasions in film
Lifetime (TV network) films
2017 directorial debut films
2010s English-language films
2010s American films